Louslitges is a commune in the Gers department in southwestern France.

Geography

Population

Transportation
There are four airports close to Louslitges: Lourdes (47 km), Pau (53 km), Toulouse (96 km), and Biarritz (137 km).

See also
Communes of the Gers department

References

Communes of Gers